Audenshaw railway station served the Audenshaw area of Greater Manchester, then part of the county of Lancashire in England. The station was originally called Hooley Hill (Guide Bridge) as the original Audenshaw station opened by the London and North Western Railway closed in 1905.

History

Opened by the London and North Western Railway, it became part of the London Midland and Scottish Railway. The line then passed on to the London Midland Region of British Railways on nationalisation in 1948. The station was then closed by British Railways in 1950.

The site today
The overbridge has long been demolished. The ticket booking building still remains, although it is in use as a computer repair shop.

References 

  
  
Station on navigable O. S. map minor station below Guide Bridge marked as Hooley Hill

Railway stations in Great Britain opened in 1887
Railway stations in Great Britain closed in 1950
Former London and North Western Railway stations
Disused railway stations in Tameside
Audenshaw